The 2020 Singapore Premier League (also known as the AIA Singapore Premier League due to sponsorship reasons) was the 3rd season of the Singapore Premier League, the top-flight Singaporean professional league for association football clubs, since its rebranding in 2018. The champions of the 2020 Singapore Premier League qualified for the AFC Champions League group stage automatically.

DPMM FC were the defending champions, but withdrew from the league prior to the season re-starting in October 2020. The league was won by Albirex Nigata (S) on the last matchday after beating Hougang United 1-0. Tampines Rovers qualified for the AFC Champions League as the highest ranked local team while Lion City Sailors and Geylang International qualified for the AFC Cup.

Format
The following key changes were made to the rules for the 2020 season:

 Singapore Premier League clubs can sign a maximum of four foreign players in the 2020 season, up from three as compared to 2019.
 From 2019, only four stadiums host regular matches.  The 8 teams (excluding DPMM) will host the matches in the following stadiums: Our Tampines Hub (Tampines Rovers and Geylang International), Jalan Besar Stadium (Young Lions and Hougang United), Bishan Stadium (Home United and Balestier Khalsa) and Jurong East Stadium (Albirex Niigata and Warriors FC).
 For 2019, Albirex is allowed to sign as many locals as their budget allows. However, the club are only allowed one Singaporean over the age of 23. Also, Albirex must have two Singaporeans in their starting lineup for each game.
 Each team is now able to register up to 28 players in their squad, an increase of 3 players as compared to 2018.
 FAS had instructed Warriors FC to sit out the 2020 Singapore Premier League season due to their financial issue.
 Tanjong Pagar United to replace Warriors FC in Singapore Premier League 2020.
 Young Lions to play their home games at Jurong West Stadium, while Hougang United will move back to their previous home at Hougang Stadium.  Tanjong Pagar United will take over Warriors and played in Jurong East Stadium.
 Home United changed its name to Lion City Sailors Football Club ahead of the new season after being taken over by SEA Group.  It is the 1st club in the SPL to be privatized.
 Local SPL clubs are required to have a minimum of six U-23 players for a squad size of 19 to 25 players; this increases to seven (squad size 26), eight (27) and nine (28).
 Players in the League shall be allocated jersey numbers 1 to 50. Jersey numbers that have been registered shall not be reused during the same season.

Disruptions due to COVID-19
Due to the COVID-19 pandemic in Singapore and more generally in Southeast Asia, the season was halted from 27 March.

The Ministry of Culture, Community and Youth approved the season recommencement on 17 October. Competition rule changes included the provision for two water breaks during a match, and clubs will be able to use up to five substitutions (in defined windows after half-time).

On 26 October 2020, DPMM FC withdrew from the league due to travel restrictions.

Teams 
A total of 8 teams competed in the league. Albirex Niigata (S) from Japan is the only foreign team invited.

Stadiums and locations

Personnel and sponsors
Note: Flags indicate national team as has been defined under FIFA eligibility rules. Players may hold more than one non-FIFA nationality.

Coaching changes

Foreigners 
Singapore Premier League clubs can sign a maximum of four foreign players in the 2020 season, up from three as compared to 2019.  However, one of them has to be 21 years old or younger on 1 January 2020.

Albirex Niigata can sign up unlimited number of Singaporean players for the new season.  Only 1 local player above 23 years old is allowed.

Players name in bold indicates the player was registered during the mid-season transfer window.

Note 1: Albirex is allowed to sign as many locals as their budget allows. However, the club are only allowed one Singaporean over the age of 23. 

Note 2: Hougang United releases Charlie Machell and Zac Anderson before the season end as their contracts ended 30 November 2020 were not extended.

League table

Results

Statistics

Top scorers

 As at 5 Dec 2020

Top Assists
 As at 5 Dec 2020

Clean Sheets
 As at 5 Dec 2020

Hat-tricks

Penalty missed

Man of the Match
 As of 5 Dec 2020

Discipline

Player 

 Most yellow cards: 7
 Ahmad Syahir (Balestier Khalsa)

 Most red cards: 1
 Adam Hakeem (Geylang International)
 Delwinder Singh (Tanjong Pagar United)
 Fadli Kamis (Balestier Khalsa)
 Firdaus Kasman (Geylang International)
 Khairul Nizam (Geylang International)
 Hami Syahin (Geylang International)
 Shahfiq Ghani (Hougang United)
 Shahrin Saberin (Geylang International)
 Zainol Gulam (Geylang International)
 Zulfadhmi Suzliman (Balestier Khalsa)

Awards

Monthly awards

Singapore Premier League Awards night winners

References

External links
 Football Association of Singapore website
 Singapore Premier League website

2020
1
2020 in Asian association football leagues